Jack Hirsh  (born January 7, 1935) is a Canadian clinician and scientist specializing in anticoagulant therapy and thrombosis.

Born in Melbourne, Australia, Hirsh is a graduate of the University of Melbourne Medical School. He studied hematology at Washington University in St. Louis, the London Postgraduate Medical School and the University of Toronto. In 1973 he joined the Faculty of Medicine of McMaster University. He is also the Director of the Hamilton Civic Hospital Research Centre.

In 1999, he was made a Member of the Order of Canada in recognition for being "one of the best in his field" and "a renowned medical researcher as well as a teacher and administrator". In 2000, he was awarded the International Gairdner Research Award "in recognition of his pioneering contributions to our understanding of the diagnosis, prevention and treatment of thromboembolic disorders." In 2000, he was inducted into the Canadian Medical Hall of Fame. He is also a Fellow of the Royal Society of Canada.

References

1935 births
Living people
Canadian medical researchers

Australian emigrants to Canada
Fellows of the Royal Society of Canada
Members of the Order of Canada
Academic staff of McMaster University
Melbourne Medical School alumni
University of Toronto alumni
Scientists from Melbourne